The County of Dalhousie is one of the 37 counties of Victoria which are part of the cadastral divisions of Australia, used for land titles. It is located to the north of Melbourne. It is bounded by the Coliban River to the west. The Goulburn River forms part of the boundary to the north-east. Puckapunyal is on its northern edge, and Kilmore and Woodend on its southern edge. The county was proclaimed in 1849.

Parishes 
Parishes include:
 Baynton, Victoria
 Broadford, Victoria
 Bylands, Victoria
 Cobaw, Victoria
 Edgecombe, Victoria
 Emberton, Victoria
 Glenaroua, Victoria
 Glenburnie, Victoria
 Glenhope, Victoria
 Heathcote, Victoria
 Lancefield, Victoria
 Langley, Victoria
 Lauriston, Victoria
 Metcalfe, Victoria
 Mitchell, Victoria
 Moranding, Victoria
 Newham, Victoria
 Northwood, Victoria
 Panyule, Victoria
 Puckapunyal, Victoria
 Pyalong, Victoria
 Redesdale, Victoria
 Springplains, Victoria
 Trentham, Victoria
 Tylden, Victoria
 Woodend, Victoria

References
Vicnames, place name details
Cadastral map of the county of Dalhousie in Victoria showing parish and county boundaries and topographical information., 1866, National Library of Australia

Counties of Victoria (Australia)